"Sally" is a song by Kerbdog and a single released on September 30, 1996, taken from their second album On the Turn recorded in 1995 by GGGarth at Sound City Studios and A&M Studios in Los Angeles. The single was released on three different CD singles, each with two different B-sides, all of which were recorded in 1996 by Pete Hofman. A promo video for "Sally" was also filmed in London.

Track listing of CD1
KERCD2

 "Sally" - 3:57
 "My Acquaintance" - 3:06
 "Retro Ready" - 3:15

Track listing of CD2
KERDD2

 "Sally" - 3:57
 "Dyed in the Wool" - 5:24
 "Spence" - 3:32

Track listing of CD3
KERCC2

 "Sally" - 3:57
 "Dragging Through" - 2:41
 "The Fear" - 4:32

Promos
There was also a CD DJ promo (KERCJ2)
 Sally (Radio Edit)
 Sally (Album Version)

Chart performance
"Sally" entered the UK singles charts on 12 October 1996 and peaked after one week.

References

1996 singles
Kerbdog songs
1995 songs
Fontana Records singles
Songs written by Cormac Battle